Don or Donald Irvine may refer to:
 Donald Roy Irvine (1920–1994), Canadian politician
 Don Irvine (wrestler) (1921–1973), British Olympic wrestler
 Donald Irvine (physician) (1935–2018), British general practitioner and president of the General Medical Council
 Don Irvine (canoeist) (born 1954), Canadian sprint canoeist